The eleventh season of Blue Bloods, a police procedural drama series created by Robin Green and Mitchell Burgess, premiered on CBS December 4, 2020. Due to production schedules being shortened by the COVID-19 pandemic, the season is reduced to 16 episodes, with the two hour season finale having aired May 14.

On April 15, 2021, CBS renewed Blue Bloods for a twelfth season.

Cast
Donnie Wahlberg (Danny Reagan), Bridget Moynahan (Erin Reagan), Will Estes (Jamie Reagan), and Len Cariou (Henry Reagan) are first credited. Tom Selleck (Frank Reagan) receives an "and" billing at the close of the main title sequence. This marks the first time since season 4 that Sami Gayle is not in the opening credits; she made one guest appearance in season 11.

Marisa Ramirez, as Danny's partner Detective Maria Baez, and Vanessa Ray, as Jamie's former partner (now wife) Eddie Janko-Reagan, continue to receive "also starring" billing for season 11. Gregory Jbara as Deputy Commissioner of Public Information Garrett Moore, Robert Clohessy as Lt. Sidney Gormley, Abigail Hawk as Detective Abigail Baker, Frank's primary aide, and Steve Schirripa as DA investigator Det. Anthony Abetemarco appear regularly and receive "special guest star" billing.

Main cast 
Tom Selleck as NYPD Police Commissioner Francis "Frank" Reagan
Donnie Wahlberg as Detective 1st Grade Daniel "Danny" Reagan
Bridget Moynahan as ADA Erin Reagan
Will Estes as Sergeant Jamison "Jamie" Reagan
Len Cariou as Henry Reagan
Marisa Ramirez as Detective 1st Grade Maria Baez 
Vanessa Ray as Officer Eddie Janko-Reagan

Special guest star 
Sami Gayle as Nicole "Nicky" Reagan-Boyle

Recurring cast 
Abigail Hawk as Detective 1st Grade Abigail Baker
Gregory Jbara as Deputy Commissioner of Public Information Garrett Moore
Robert Clohessy as Lieutenant Sidney "Sid" Gormley
Steve Schirripa as DA Investigator Anthony Abetemarco
Lauren Patten as Officer Rachel Witten
Will Hochman as Detective 3rd Grade Joseph "Joe" Hill
Rosyln Ruff as D.A. Kimberly "Kim" Crawford
Peter Hermann as Jack Boyle
Andrew Terraciano as Sean Reagan 
Callie Thorne as Maggie Gibson

Guest star
Bonnie Somerville as Paula Hill
Whoopi Goldberg as Regina Thomas
Lyle Lovett as Texas Ranger Waylon Gates

Episodes

Ratings

References

External links
 
 

Blue Bloods (TV series)
2020 American television seasons
2021 American television seasons